Wat Phichaya Yatikaram Worawihan, also referred to as Wat Phichai Yat is a Thai Buddhist temple in Bangkok, regarded as one of the most beautiful and outstanding temples of Bangkok and Thonburi side. The temple is located by the waterside of Khlong Somdet Chao Phraya in Khlong San District near present Wongwian Lek.

Wat Phichai Yat was registered to a national ancient monument by the Fine Arts Department in the year 1949.

Gallery

See more
Wat Anongkharam – a counterpart temple

References

Khlong San district
Buddhist temples in Bangkok
Registered ancient monuments in Bangkok
19th-century Buddhist temples